Events in the year 2019 in Fiji.

Incumbents
President: Jioji Konrote
Prime Minister: Frank Bainimarama

Events
8 October – An altercation between Chinese and Taiwanese diplomats during a reception at the Grand Pacific hotel in Suva leaves one Taiwanese official in hospital. The incident is seen as a spilling over of diplomatic tensions between the two governments over their respective influences across the Pacific.
29 December – Two people are killed as Cyclone Sarai passes southeast of the country, bringing heavy wind and rain and forcing the temporary evacuation of more than 2,000 people.

Deaths

5 February – Manasa Qoro, rugby union player (b. 1964).
19 June – Filipe Bole, politician, Minister for Foreign Affairs (b. 1936).

See also
 	

 		
 2019 Oceania Cup (rugby league)

References

 
2010s in Fiji
Years of the 21st century in Fiji
Fiji
Fiji